Karimaddula is one of the oldest villages in the Gadivemula mandal of the Kurnool district in Andhra Pradesh, India. With a population of 3881 as per the census 2011, This village comes under panyam assembly constituency and nandyal parliamentary constituency.

References

Villages in Kurnool district